Kans Quila is a fortified castle located in Mathura, India. The fort is named after "Kansa", a king who lived around 6th century BC, in the ancient city of Mathura, India. Kansa was the maternal uncle of Krishna, a Hindu deity. The fort is believed to be from the age of Mahabharata, about 6th century BC. It is situated on the northern banks of the Yamuna River. The fort is also known as the Old Fort or Purana Quila.

Ancient texts suggest, Kansa tried to kill Krishna when Krishna was born. Historical data suggests this fort was destroyed and rebuilt at least 12-15 times. The last person to built this fort It was in 16th century by Raja Man Singh of Amber. The ruins of the fort has a mixture of Hindu and Mughal architectural styles.

An observatory is said to have been added in the complex by Maharaja Sawai Jai Singh (1699–1743), however it has been demolished now. The fort has an audience hall surrounded by red sandstone pillars. The fort was earlier used as a barrier against floods.

References

Forts in Uttar Pradesh
Rajput architecture
Tourist attractions in Mathura